The Federal Correctional Institution, Florence (FCI Florence) is a medium-security United States federal prison for male inmates in Colorado. Part of the Florence Federal Correctional Complex (FCC Florence), it is operated by the Federal Bureau of Prisons, a division of the United States Department of Justice.

Notable incidents

On the morning hours of December 29, 2008, correction officers at FCI Florence found inmate Pablo Zúñiga-García, 33, dead in his cell. Zúñiga-García, who was serving a 54-month sentence for an illegal-immigration conviction, had suffered numerous blunt-force injuries to his head. A subsequent FBI investigation found that inmates José Augustín Pluma, Juan Martín Ruelas, Mark Rosález, and Justin Hernández, all inmates at FCI Florence and members of the Sureños gang, orchestrated the assault.

Prior to the fatal assault, Hernández, a Sureños leader, ordered several other inmates to physically assault Zúñiga-García. Hernández's lieutenant, Rosález, asked another inmate to act as a lookout during the assault and prevent Zúñiga-García from escaping. During the early hours of December 29, 2008, Pluma and three of the unnamed co-conspirators entered the cell with their makeshift weapons, padlocks attached to belts, and began a 15-minute beating of Zúñiga-García while Ruelas and another unnamed co-conspirator took their places as lookouts. Three other participants pleaded to lesser charges and agreed to testify against the four men.

Pluma, Ruelas, Rosález, and Hernández were convicted of conspiring to assault Zúñiga-García and second-degree murder on June 14, 2011. They are all serving lengthy sentences at high-security facilities.

Notable inmates (current and former)
†Beckley was incarcerated at the adjacent FCI Florence minimum-security prison camp.

See also 
List of U.S. federal prisons
Federal Bureau of Prisons
Incarceration in the United States

References 

Buildings and structures in Fremont County, Colorado
Florence
Prisons in Colorado